Yordan Ivanov was a Bulgarian literary historian. A full member of the Bulgarian Academy of Sciences since 1909, he was an expert on the literary and cultural heritage of the Bogomils.

Ivanov is known as the discoverer of the manuscript original of Istoriya Slavyanobolgarskaya in the Zograf Monastery. He was the favorite lecturer of Yordan Yovkov.

He was the author of several fundamental historical works revealing the Bulgarian character of Macedonia, and the author of many studies on his hometown and region.

From 1920–1923 and again from 1927–1930, he was posted as a professor of Bulgarian language at the Institut national des langues et civilisations orientales in Paris, which laid the foundation for Cyrillo-Methodian Studies in France.

Selected books 
 North Macedonia (1906)
 Bulgarians in Macedonia (1915)

References 

1872 births
1947 deaths
Linguists from Bulgaria
Literary historians
Bulgarian medievalists
Bulgarian folklorists
Istoriya Slavyanobolgarskaya
Members of the Macedonian Scientific Institute
University of Lausanne alumni
Sofia University alumni
Academic staff of Sofia University
Members of the Bulgarian Academy of Sciences
People from Kyustendil